is a former Japanese football player.

Playing career
Taniguchi was born in Osaka Prefecture on July 15, 1974, but grew up in the town of Mikame, Ehime (amalgamated into the city of Seiyo in 2004). After graduating from high school, he joined Nagoya Grampus Eight in 1993. He played several matches as side back every seasons until 1996. However he could not play many matches. In 1997, he moved to Japan Football League club Brummel Sendai. However he could hardly play in the match. In 1998, he moved to Regional Leagues club Ehime FC. The club was promoted to Japan Football League from 2001. He retired end of 2002 season.

Club statistics

References

External links

1974 births
Living people
Association football people from Osaka Prefecture
Japanese footballers
J1 League players
Japan Football League (1992–1998) players
Japan Football League players
Nagoya Grampus players
Vegalta Sendai players
Ehime FC players
Association football defenders